Entephria polata is a moth of the family Geometridae first described by Philogène Auguste Joseph Duponchel in 1830. It is found from Fennoscandia to north-eastern Siberia. It is also present in northern North America.

Adults are on wing in July.

The larval food plants were unknown for a long time. But Itämies and Várkonyi reported (in 1997) the larvae on Empetrum nigrum ssp. hermaphroditum. The larvae were observed to live on the buds of the plant in early summer. Several pupa of this species have been found in a web under rocks.

Subspecies
Entephria polata polata
Entephria polata transsibirica Vasilenko, 1990
Entephria polata brullei (Lefebvre, 1836)
Entephria polata bradorata (Munroe, 1951)
Entephria polata ursata (Munroe, 1951)
Entephria polata kidluitata (Munroe, 1951)
Entephria polata eleutiata (Munroe, 1951)

References

External links

Larentiini
Moths of Europe
Taxa named by Philogène Auguste Joseph Duponchel